John MacLean or John Maclean is the name of:

Arts and entertainment
 John MacLean, known as The Juan MacLean, US musician, formerly of Six Finger Satellite
 John Maclean (film director), Scottish film director, screenwriter and musician, formerly of The Beta Band
 Sir John MacLean (historian) (1811–1895), British civil servant and author
 John Maclean (photographer), British photographer
 John Bayne Maclean (1862–1950), Canadian publisher
 John N. Maclean (born 1943), author of Fire on the Mountain: The True Story of the South Canyon Fire

Politics
 John MacLean (Manitoba politician) (1929–1987), Canadian Member of Parliament
 John Maclean (Scottish socialist) (1879–1923), Scottish political figure
 John Duncan MacLean (1873–1948), former Premier of the Canadian province of British Columbia
 Sir John Maclean, 1st Baronet (1604–1666), Scottish naval officer and merchant who moved to Sweden and took the name John Hans Makeléer
 Sir John Maclean, 4th Baronet (1670–1716), Scottish noble who was the 20th Clan Chief of Clan Maclean from 1674 to 1716
 John Dubh Maclean, 4th Chief of Clan MacLean (14th century)
 John Dubh Maclean, 1st Laird of Morvern (16th century), founder of the Macleans of Kinlochaine, Drimnin, and Pennycross
 John Garbh Maclean, 1st Laird of Coll (1668–1756), as an independent unit
 John Garbh Maclean, 7th Laird of Coll, 17th century Scottish official
 John MacLean (honorary sheriff) (1860–1940), pioneer and sheriff in Última Esperanza Province, Chile

Sports
 John Maclean (Australian cricketer) (born 1946), Australian cricketer
 John MacLean (English cricketer) (1901–1986), English cricketer
 John MacLean (ice hockey) (born 1964), ice hockey player and coach
 John MacLean (sportscaster) (1921–1973), Major League Baseball announcer
 John Maclean (sportsperson) (born 1966), Australian triathlete, rower, and motivational speaker

Other
 John Maclean Jr. (1800–1886), president of Princeton University
 John Patterson MacLean (1848–1939), American Universalist minister, archaeologist and historian
 John Maclean (pastor) (1851–1928), Canadian pastor and writer on American-Indians
 John Norman Maclean (minister), Canadian-American Presbyterian minister

See also
 John McClane, fictional character played by Bruce Willis in the 1988 film Die Hard
 John McLean (disambiguation)
 John McClean (disambiguation)
 John Dubh Maclean (disambiguation)
 John Garbh Maclean (disambiguation)
 Sir John Maclean (disambiguation)